Brewing Justice: Fair Trade Coffee, Sustainability and Survival is a book by American academic Daniel Jaffee.

References

See also 

Coffee culture
Fair trade
2007 non-fiction books
University of California Press books
Works about coffee